Events from the year 1691 in Sweden

Incumbents
 Monarch – Charles XI

Events

 - Barnängens manufaktur is established in Stockholm.
 - The city of Jönköping burns down. 
 - The crops fail all over Sweden. 
 Sven Andersson (farmworker) is executed for having sex with a nymph.
 The theater company Dän Swänska Theatren is dissolved.

Births

 March 28 - Charles Emil Lewenhaupt, general (died 1743) 
 Christina Beata Dagström, glassworks owner (died 1754)

Deaths

 Sven Andersson (farmworker)  (born 1668)

References

 
Years of the 17th century in Sweden
Sweden